Said Bayazid (born 20 January 1977) is a Syrian former professional footballer who played as a forward.

Club career
Bayazid played for most of his career in Greece, including one season with Proodeftiki and two seasons with Akratitos in the Greek Super League.

International career
Bayazid made several appearances for the senior Syria national football team from 1997 to 2001. He scored 11 goals in only seven qualifying matches for the FIFA World Cup.

Career statistics

International 
Scores and results list. Syria's goal tally first.

References

External links

 at goalzz.com

1977 births
Living people
Association football forwards
Syrian footballers
Syria international footballers
Hutteen Latakia players
A.P.O. Akratitos Ano Liosia players
Proodeftiki F.C. players
Al-Jaish Damascus players
Syrian expatriate footballers
Expatriate footballers in Greece
Syrian Premier League players
Syrian expatriate sportspeople in Greece